The Valeriepieris circle is a South China Sea-centered circular region on the world map that is about  in radius (roughly 6.7% of the Earth's total surface area) and contains more than half the world’s population. It was named after the Reddit username of Ken Myers, a Texas English as a second language teacher who first drew attention to the phenomenon in 2013. The map became a meme and was featured in numerous forms of media. 

In 2015, the circle was tested by Danny Quah, who verified the claim but moved the circle slightly to exclude most of Japan, and used a globe model rather than a map projection as well as more specific calculations. He calculated that, as of 2015, half of the world's population lived within a  radius of the city of Mong Khet in Myanmar. 

In 2022, the original circle was tested by Riaz Shah, Professor of Practice at Hult International Business School.  Using data from the UN World Population Prospects of September 2022 he showed that 4.2bn people live inside the circle, out of 8.0bn total.  

The most common visual of the circle, originally used by Myers and also featured by io9 and Tech in Asia, used the Winkel tripel projection.

References

Geographical regions
World population
Population density
World maps
Things named after people